Abdul Mottaleb Akanda was a Bangladesh Nationalist Party politician and the former Member of Parliament of Gaibandha-4.

Career
Akanda was elected to parliament from Gaibandha-4 as a Bangladesh Nationalist Party candidate in 2001. He allegedly diverted flood relief from Mahimaganj Union, after the union voted Abdul Latif Prodhan, an Bangladesh Awami League politician, chairman of the Union Parishad.

Death
Akanda died on 11 March 2006 from a heart attack.

References

Bangladesh Nationalist Party politicians
2006 deaths
8th Jatiya Sangsad members